Chicago a cappella is a non-profit organization devoted to furthering the art of ensemble singing without any instruments. The group of professional singers began in 1993 by Jonathan Miller and conduct a series of performances annually. The organization displays a yearly subscription series for Chicago residents, produces studio recordings as well as live and broadcast-media musical content, and performs on tour and in special arrangements. The ensemble is known for their outstanding vocal abilities, innovative programming, and have a reputation of being a leader within the choral field. Expanding from a collection of a Gregorian chants to the Beatles and beyond, the singers are known for their wide repertoire including early works, vocal jazz, and spirituals. The ensemble is also a champion of performing works by living composers.

Organizational History 
The Artistic Director, Jonathan Miller, founded the ensemble in 1993 by performing as a low bass and directing rehearsals for the group’s first 14 seasons. One of the founding ensemble members, Matthew Greenberg, joined the administrative staff in 1995 and presently serves as the organization's Executive Director. In 2007, Patrick Sinozich became the ensembles first Music Director after being appointed by Miller.  In 2008, Miller was awarded the Louis Botto Award for Innovative Action and Entrepreneurial Zeal from Chorus America and was recognized for turning Chicago a cappella into a professional vocal ensemble.  The organization's audiences have actively grown since the ensembles formation and an ensemble of about ten singers typically perform in a wide array of concert programs each year in Chicago, Evanston, Naperville, and Oak Park, IL. The ensemble has performed musical works from their world, national, and local premiere. Chicago a cappella has presented new music from composers such as Joseph Jennings, Chen Yi, Stacy Garrop, Rollo Dilworth, Tania León, and Ezequiel Viñao. Chicago a cappella has performed more than 350 concerts and assembled over 200 performances through its Chicago-based sequence. When touring, the ensemble has performed in 13 different states throughout the United States and Mexico. The group has been played regularly on WFMT radio and through broadcasts spread by American Public Media, including the award-winning radio show Performance Today. The ensemble has made nine CD recordings of music extending from Renaissance masses to modern-day music. Currently, the organization's administrative offices are located inside of the Athenaeum Theatre in Chicago.

Community Outreach 
Chicago a cappella undertook residencies in Chicago Public Schools during both the 2010-2011 and 2011-2012 school years. In 2012, Chicago a cappella produced its first annual Youth Choral Festival and launched the ensemble’s High School Internship program for students looking for experience in performance and arts administration.

High School Apprenticeship Program 
The group's High School Apprenticeship Program offers high school students administrative and musical training with the group's musicians and staff.

Youth Choral Festival 
The Youth Choral Festival is an all-day workshop that brings together student ensembles from high schools around the Chicago area with Chicago a cappella's experienced singers and directors for a one-day series of master classes and workshops that ends with a cumulative performance from all ensembles.

¡Cantaré! Chicago 
¡Cantaré! Chicago was created in Minneapolis by VocalEssence but later partnered with Chicago a cappella to create a program where Mexican composers visit and teach in Chicago classrooms. The cross-cultural program was designed to generate a deeper knowledge of Mexican culture and strengthens the musical skills of elementary and high school students in Chicago. Chicago a cappella offers a resource guide and CD.

Custom Outreach Programs 
Chicago a cappella’s Education Outreach Program is for all singers and students in any age range and level of skill. The programs are taught by musical artists from Chicago a cappella’s professional singers and directors. The Outreach Programs are designed based on the individual needs of each organization involved. The three options that Chicago a cappella offers are master classes, choral residencies, and youth concerts.

Non-profit Community Partner Program 
Chicago a cappella collaborates with non-profit organizations to honor them during their concerts and educate the audience about the work each organization provides for their community.

Discography 

Palestrina: Music for the Christmas Season (1996)
Mathurin Forestier:Missa Baises moy; Missa L'homme armé (1999)
Go Down Moses: Tracing the Roots of the African-American Spiritual (2001)
Holidays a cappella Live (2003)
Eclectric (2005)
Shall I Compare Thee?: Choral Songs on Shakespeare Texts (2005)
Christmas a cappella: Songs From Around the World (2008)
Days of Awe and Rejoicing: Radiant Gems of Jewish Music (2011)
Bound for Glory: New Settings of African-American Spirituals (2014)
Global Transcendence: Sacred World Harmony and Chant (2014)

References

External links 
Official web site
[ Chicago a cappella at Allmusic]
Facebook Page
“Chicago A Cappella Group Performs 'Global Transcendence' Concert With Repertoire For World Religions”, Antonia Blumberg, The Huffington Post, 2014-10-17, accessed 3 January 2015.
 Natalia Dagenhart: Chicago a cappella lights up Chicagoland with Holidays a cappella
 Natalia Dagenhart: Chicago a cappella brings Love Stories to Chicagoland
 Natalia Dagenhart: Chicago a cappella presents The History of Rock and Soul, Part 2

Choirs in Illinois
A cappella musical groups
Musical groups from Chicago
1993 establishments in Illinois
Musical groups established in 1993
Cedille Records artists
Centaur Records artists